Comet, Ohio may refer to:

 Comet, Jackson County, Ohio
 Comet, Summit County, Ohio